No Knife was a band from San Diego, California. They played an innovative form of rock that combined aspects of math rock, post-hardcore, and other indie rock.

The band's original lineup was Mitch Wilson (vocals/guitar), Brian Desjean (bass), Aaron Mancini (guitar/vocals), and Ike Zaremba (drums).  Prior to their second full-length, the band replaced Mancini with Ryan Ferguson (guitar/vocals). After their first and second full-lengths, Drunk on the Moon (1996)  and Hit Man Dreams (1997), Chris Prescott was enlisted to play drums.  The group went on to release two more full-lengths: Fire in the City of Automatons (1999)  and Riot for Romance! (2002).

No Knife often toured with Jimmy Eat World. After hinting on their website in March 2008 that they might reunite in late 2008 or early 2009, the band was announced as the opening act for three west coast dates on Jimmy Eat World's "Clarity x 10" tour. No Knife played their final show Thursday, June 18, 2009 at the Belly Up Tavern in Solana Beach, Ca.  The last song performed was "Mission Control".

The band reunited to play shows in 2014, 2015 and 2019 mostly at The Casbah in San Diego. Most recently on July 15th 2019 ending their set with "The Red Bedroom"

Post-band projects
Mitch Wilson is currently singing and playing guitar and keyboards in Lunar Maps who released their self-titled debut album on June 15, 2011.   
Brian Desjean was playing bass for Get Your Death On!, a San Diego rock trio which formed in late 2005  and now he is playing bass and drums with Wilson in  Lunar Maps.  
Ryan Ferguson is now a solo artist who has released an EP, Three Four, and a full length album, Only Trying to Help. He has done some touring, including opening for the San Diego rock band, Switchfoot.
Chris Prescott joined the live band for Pinback in late September, 2005, playing guitar, keyboard and singing backing vocals. then went on his first full tour with them as their drummer in 2006, and went on to record with them for Autumn of the Seraphs which was released in September 2007. He also is playing guitar/vocals for The Jade Shader which formed in 2004.

Band members
 Mitch Wilson - Guitar, vocals (1993-2003)
 Brian Desjean - Bass (1993-2003)
 Ryan Ferguson - Guitar, vocals (1997-2003)
 Chris Prescott - Drums (1997-2003)
 Ike Zaremba - Drums (1993-1997)
 Aaron Mancini - Guitar, vocals (1993-1997)

Discography
 Drunk on the Moon (1996)
 Hit Man Dreams (1997)
 Fire in the City of Automatons (1999)
 Riot for Romance (2002)

References

External links
 Official website

Indie rock musical groups from California
Musical groups from San Diego
Time Bomb Recordings artists